Susanne Karstedt  is a German criminologist. She is a professor in the School of Criminology and Criminal Justice at Griffith University in Queensland, Australia.

Biography 
A native of Germany, Kartstedt trained in sociology at the University of Hamburg. Prior to joining Griffith University, she held positions at the University of Leeds, Keele University, Bielefield University, and the University of Hamburg.

Karstedt research interests include mass atrocity crimes, state crimes, and transitional justice. She is known for work on the relationship between emotions and criminal justice.

In 2007, the American Society of Criminology presented Karstedt with the Sellin-Glueck Award, given to criminologists for the introduction of new perspectives on the problem of crime and justice outside the U.S. In 2016, she was awarded the Law and Society Association International Prize. In 2018, she received the European Society of Criminology's European Criminology Award. In 2020 she was elected Fellow of the Academy of the Social Sciences in Australia.

Selected works

References

Living people
Academics of the University of Leeds
Year of birth missing (living people)
German women criminologists
German criminologists
Academic staff of Griffith University
University of Hamburg alumni
Fellows of the Academy of the Social Sciences in Australia